The men's rings competition was one of eight events for male competitors in artistic gymnastics at the 1984 Summer Olympics in Los Angeles.  The qualification and final rounds took place on July 29, 31 and August 4 at UCLA’s Pauley Pavilion. There were 71 competitors from 19 nations, with nations competing in the team event having 6 gymnasts while other nations could have to up to 3 gymnasts. The event was won in a tie between Li Ning of China, in the nation's debut in the Games, and Koji Gushiken, with Japan's first gold medal in the rings since 1972 (and fourth overall). The bronze medal went to American Mitchell Gaylord, the nation's first medal in the event since 1932. The Soviet Union's eight-Games podium streak in the event ended with no Soviets competing due to the boycott.

Background

This was the 16th appearance of the event, which is one of the five apparatus events held every time there were apparatus events at the Summer Olympics (no apparatus events were held in 1900, 1908, 1912, or 1920). None of the six finalists from 1980 returned; five of the six were from boycotting nations, while the other (Dan Grecu of Romania) had retired after suffering a muscle tear during the 1980 final. With the absence of the Soviets, the field was open to the traditional power Japan and rising powers China and the United States. Japan's Koji Gushiken had tied Soviet Dmitry Bilozerchev for the 1983 world championship, with Li Ning of China third.

The People's Republic of China and San Marino each made their debut in the men's rings. The United States made its 14th appearance, breaking a tie with the absent Hungary for most of any nation; the Americans had missed only the inaugural 1896 rings and the boycotted 1980 Games.

Competition format

Each nation entered a team of six gymnasts or up to three individual gymnasts. All entrants in the gymnastics competitions performed both a compulsory exercise and a voluntary exercise for each apparatus. The scores for all 12 exercises were summed to give an individual all-around score. These exercise scores were also used for qualification for the apparatus finals. The two exercises (compulsory and voluntary) for each apparatus were summed to give an apparatus score. 

The 1984 Games expanded the number of finalists from six to eight. Nations were still limited to two finalists each. Others were ranked 9th through 71st. Half of the preliminary score carried over to the final.

Schedule

All times are Pacific Daylight Time (UTC-7)

Results

Seventy-one gymnasts competed in the compulsory and optional rounds on July 29 and 31. The eight highest scoring gymnasts advanced to the final on August 4. Each country was limited to two competitors in the final. Half of the points earned by each gymnast during both the compulsory and optional rounds carried over to the final. This constitutes the "prelim" score. The results were notable for the shared gold medal between the top two scorers.

External links

Official Olympic Report
www.gymnasticsresults.com
www.gymn-forum.net

Men's rings
Men's 1984
Men's events at the 1984 Summer Olympics